Mystified is a 2019 Philippine fantasy film, directed and written by Mark A. Reyes, starring Iza Calzado, Karylle, Sunshine Dizon and Diana Zubiri. It was released on March 29, 2019, on Iflix.

Premise
The film is about the four witches namely Adela (Iza Calzado), Althea (Sunshine Dizon),  Helena (Karylle), and Kathalina (Diana Zubiri) who descended from their kingdom of witchcraft and magic to fit in the mortal world and fight the devil forces.

Cast

Main
 Iza Calzado as Adela
 Sunshine Dizon as Althea
 Karylle as Helena
 Diana Zubiri as Kathalina

Supporting
 Sunshine Cruz as Hellga
 Mostafa Elezali as Luvictus
 Cheska Iñigo as Devana
 Ian Ignacio as Aki
 Jinri Park as Zandra
 Leigh Guda as Violeta
 Caprice Cayetano as Kylie
 Ashley Sarmiento as Clara
 Jana Victoria as 1800s Hellga
 Matthias Rhoads as Miguel
 Vince Vandorpe as Javi
 Lexi Gonzales as Pauline

Awards and nominations

References

External Links
 Official website
 

Philippine fantasy action films
Filipino-language films
2019 fantasy films